The 2014–15 season of Anadolu Efes S.K. is the 36th season of the club in the highest division of Turkish basketball. It was the first full season Dušan Ivković was the head coach of the team.

Roster

Transactions

In

|}

Out

|}

Notes

References

2014–15 Euroleague by club
2014-15
2014–15 in Turkish basketball by club